Peter Bonde (born 14 February 1958) is a Danish former professional footballer who is the manager of Næstved BK. In 2018 he became the head coach of the China women's national under-20 football team.

References

Hareide dropper Olsens assistenter‚ bold.dk, 5 February 2016

External links
Profile at the Danish FA

1958 births
Living people
Association football defenders
Danish men's footballers
Danish football managers
Lyngby Boldklub players
Næstved Boldklub players
Danish Superliga players
Næstved Boldklub managers
Denmark women's national football team managers
People from Næstved Municipality
Sportspeople from Region Zealand